The 2006 ICF Canoe Slalom World Championships were held in Prague, Czech Republic between 2-6 August 2006 under the auspices of International Canoe Federation at the Prague-Troja Canoeing Centre. It was the 30th edition. Prague became the second city to host both the slalom and sprint world championships, having hosted the latter in 1958 when Prague was part of Czechoslovakia. Nottingham, Great Britain was the first, hosting the slalom world championships in 1995 and the sprint world championships in 1981.

Medal summary

Men's

Canoe

Kayak

Women's

Kayak

Medal table

Notes

References
Official results
International Canoe Federation

Icf Canoe Slalom World Championships, 2006
World Canoe Slalom Championships
ICF Canoe Slalom World Championships
International sports competitions hosted by the Czech Republic
Sports competitions in Prague
2000s in Prague
Canoeing and kayaking competitions in the Czech Republic
August 2006 sports events in Europe